Nun  (Hebrew: נוּן Nūn, 'Perpetuity'), in the Hebrew Bible, was a man from the Tribe of Ephraim, grandson of Ammihud, son of Elishama, and father of Joshua.

Biblical context
Nun grew up in and may have lived his entire life in the Israelites' Egyptian captivity, where the Egyptians "made life bitter for them with harsh labor at mortar and bricks and with all sorts of tasks in the field". In Aramaic, "nun" means "fish".  Thus the Midrash tells:  "[T]he son of him whose name was as the name of a fish would lead them [the Israelites] into the land" (Genesis Rabba 97:3).

Traditional tomb

The similarly named Palestinian village of Kifl Hares, located northwest of Ariel in Samaria (Northern West Bank), is now home both tombs.

References

Books of Chronicles people
Egypt in the Hebrew Bible